Bloomington is a community in southern Washington County, Utah, United States, which now forms the southwestern part of the city of St. George.

Access to Bloomington is achieved by Interstate 15's interchange with Brigham Road (Exit 4), Southern Parkway (SR-7) Exit 2, or by Tonaquint Drive on the north side of the "Bloomington Circle", a loop that encircles the "Bloomington Country Club" neighborhood.

Notable Events 
In 2005 there was massive flooding in the Washington County area. The Man-O-War bridge usually remained opened; however, it was closed for a few hours at a time during the worst of the flooding. The community gathered together to sandbag and protect homes along the Virgin River. Although many were flooded, no houses were swept away as they were in the Green Valley area.

Man O War Bridge 
The Man O War Bridge crosses the Virgin River and connects the "Bloomington Circle" to I-15 via Pioneer Road.

Bloomington Country Club
The Bloomington country club is a private, members golf course in Bloomington.

Climate
According to the Köppen Climate Classification system, Bloomington has a semi-arid climate, abbreviated "BSk" on climate maps.

Notable people
 Texas Rose Bascom (1922-1993), rodeo trick rider and fancy trick roper, Hollywood actress, hall of fame inductee

References

Populated places in Washington County, Utah
Cities in the Mojave Desert